"Wouldnit (I'm a Star)" is a song by Yoko Ono, originally released in 1996 on the album Rising. A remix of the song appeared on Ono's 2001 album Blueprint for a Sunrise.

Background
Yoko Ono stated in an interview that the song was inspired by her childhood when her pianist father put her into musical training at the age of two and a half years old, but also the first song she wrote, called "Jiyu-Gakuen".

Critical reception
David Fricke, in his review of Rising for Rolling Stone, stated, "The plain-spoken shiver with which she renders the episodes of rape, murder and child abuse in the bone-dry reggae stroll 'Wouldnit' suggests the dark intimacy of a frightened young girl's secret diary." Dominique Leone of Pitchfork Media opined that the version that appeared on Blueprint for a Sunrise is "merely awkward. Ono drops lines [...] over a cocktail lounge groove destined for Hell's karaoke bars." Rolling Stones David Fricke described the Blueprint for a Sunrise version as a "creepy jazz-funk remake."

Track listingDigital download "Wouldnit (I'm a Star)" (Dave Audé Radio Mix) – 3:57
 "Wouldnit (I'm a Star)" (Dave Audé Club Mix) – 7:04
 "Wouldnit (I'm a Star)" (Emjae Club Mix) – 4:48
 "Wouldnit (I'm a Star)" (Ralphi Rosario Club Mix) – 6:57
 "Wouldnit (I'm a Star)" (Richard Morel Vocal Mix) – 8:53
 "Wouldnit (I'm a Star)" (Rob Rives Back 2 the Factory Mix) – 7:21
 "Wouldnit (I'm a Star)" (DTM Main Mix) – 6:23
 "Wouldnit (I'm a Star)" (Timmy Loop's Electric Club Remix) – 6:51
 "Wouldnit (I'm a Star)" (M-Deep Club) – 5:15Digital download (Dub Mixes)'
 "Wouldnit (I'm a Star)" (Dave Audé Dub Mix) – 5:59
 "Wouldnit (I'm a Star)" (Richard Morel Dub Mix) – 7:41
 "Wouldnit (I'm a Star)" (Emjae Dub) – 6:31
 "Wouldnit (I'm a Star)" (Ralphi Rosario Dub Mix) – 6:57
 "Wouldnit (I'm a Star)" (Rob Rives Back 2 The Factory Instrumental) – 7:21
 "Wouldnit (I'm a Star)" (Yiannis 'I'm a Star, Get It' Vocal Dub) – 7:45
 "Wouldnit (I'm a Star)" (Yiannis 'I'm a Star, Get It' Instrumental) – 7:45
 "Wouldnit (I'm a Star)" (DTM Dub) – 6:53

Charts

Weekly charts

Year-end charts

See also
 List of number-one dance singles of 2010 (U.S.)

References 

Yoko Ono songs
1995 songs
2010 singles
Song recordings produced by Yoko Ono
Songs written by Yoko Ono
2001 songs